Satya Narayan Mandal (Nepali: सत्यनारायण मंडल) is a Nepalese politician and the former party leader of Province No. 2. He was a member of the Communist Party of Nepal (Unified Marxist–Leninist) till 2022 general election.

Career
Satya Narayan Mandal is one of the oldest politicians of Nepal. He joined the party in 2028 BS. He became an active member of CPN (Party) in 2036 BS and became a member of National Assembly in 2048 BS. He is the first Minister from Dhobi community.

He was elected the non-departmental minister of Nepal on 12 October 2015 CE under the government of Khadga Prasad Oli. He then transferred served as Sports and Youth Minister of Nepal.

Electoral history

2017 Nepalese provincial elections

References

Living people
People from Saptari District
Year of birth missing (living people)
Nepal Communist Party (NCP) politicians
Members of the Provincial Assembly of Madhesh Province
Members of the National Assembly (Nepal)
Members of the 2nd Nepalese Constituent Assembly
Communist Party of Nepal (Unified Marxist–Leninist) politicians